Makedonski Brod (meaning "Macedonian Ford") is a small town in the central part of North Macedonia, on the south-eastern part of Suva Gora, western Karadžica and south-western Dautica mountains. The town is the seat of Makedonski Brod Municipality.

Geography

Makedonski Brod is one of the smallest towns in North Macedonia. It is located in the region of Poreče and is the centre of the region. The town lies on the banks of the upper region of the river Treska.

History
In the location of the present-day town, there was a bridge that connected the towns of Prilep and Kičevo, which gave the name of the town. According to a tomb inscription found in the village of Krapa, it was determined that the area was populated by the Romans. Later, with the arrival of Slavs to the Balkan Peninsula, the Slavic tribe Berziti (Brsjaci) settled here.

During the 15th century the Albanian state, League of Lezhë, under Gjergj Kastrioti Skanderbeg won a battle in the Battle of Mokra 1445. The Albanian army under Skanderbeg managed to defeat the Ottoman army.

In the vicinity of Makedonski Brod, near the village of Devič, are visible remnants of buildings that confirm that in this region, in the Middle Ages, there was a town/settlement which functioned as a centre for the entire area.

In the late 19th and early 20th century, Makedonski Brod was part of the Manastir Vilayet of the Ottoman Empire.
The then village of Brod was considered by Serbian authorities to be a "haven for evildoers of Kičevo". It is possible that Haki Efendi of Teqe, a contemporary Albanian political leader, was from the village, which at the time had a Bektashi tekke. Bukri is a former village which was located in the outskirts of modern Brod. Its etymological formation stems from Albanian bukur.

From 1929 to 1941, Makedonski Brod was part of the Vardar Banovina of the Kingdom of Yugoslavia.

Demographics
As of the 2021 census, Makedonski Brod had 3,643 residents with the following ethnic composition:
Macedonians 3,511
Persons for whom data are taken from administrative sources 93
Albanians 16
Roma 9
Serbs 7
Others 7

According to the 2002 census, the town had a total of 3,740 inhabitants. Ethnic groups in the village include:
Macedonians 3,725
Serbs 9
Romani 3
Bosniaks 1
Others 2

Monuments of culture
Also to be seen is the Devina Tower, built in the vicinity of the cave Pešna, here also may be found remnants of the town's walls which were, according to legend, built by the young girl Pešna, sister of the hero Krale (King) Marko.

In the town and its vicinity a large number of churches were built, among which are the town's church St. Mary, St. Dimitrius in the village of Trebino, St. Nicholas in the village of Plasnica, etc.

Sports
Local football club FK Proleter have played in the Macedonian Third League.

See also
North Macedonia
Battle of Mokra (1445)

References

External links 
 Official Website of Makedonski Brod – Website with detailed information and history of Makedonski Brod  

Towns in North Macedonia
Makedonski Brod Municipality